In data structures, a range query consists of preprocessing some input data into a data structure to efficiently answer any number of queries on any subset of the input. Particularly, there is a group of problems that have been extensively studied where the input is an array of unsorted numbers and a query consists of computing some function, such as the minimum, on a specific range of the array.

Definition

Therefore, any query might be answered by doing .

Finally, this solution can be extended to two-dimensional arrays with a similar preprocessing.

Examples

Semigroup operators

Andrew Yao showed that there exists an efficient solution for range queries that involve semigroup operators. He proved that for any constant , a preprocessing of time and space  allows to answer range queries on lists where  is a semigroup operator in  time, where  is a certain functional inverse of the Ackermann function.

There are some semigroup operators that admit slightly better solutions. For instance when . Then  denotes the corresponding minimum range query. There are several data structures that allow to answer a range minimum query in  time using a preprocessing of time and space . One such solution is based on the equivalence between this problem and the lowest common ancestor problem.

Because the lowest common ancestor can be solved in constant time using a preprocessing of time and space , range minimum query can as well. The solution when  is analogous. Cartesian trees can be constructed in linear time.

Mode

In case of ties any of the most frequent elements might be picked as mode. Several data structures have been devised to solve this problem, we summarize some of the results in the following table.

Median

This particular case is of special interest since finding the median has several applications. On the other hand, the median problem, a special case of the selection problem, is solvable in O(n), using the median of medians algorithm. However its generalization through range median queries is recent. Range median queries cannot be solved by following any of the previous methods discussed above including Yao's approach for semigroup operators.

There have been studied two variants of this problem, the offline version, where all the k queries of interest are given in a batch, and a version where all the preprocessing is done up front. The offline version can be solved with  time and  space.

The following pseudocode of the quickselect algorithm shows how to find the element of rank  in  an unsorted array of distinct elements, to find the range medians we set .

 rangeMedian(A, i, j, r) {
     if A.length() == 1
         return A[1]
 
     if A.low is undefined then
         m = median(A)
         A.low  = [e in A | e <= m]
         A.high = [e in A | e > m ]
 
     calculate t the number of elements of A[i, j] that belong to A.low
 
     if r <= t then
         return rangeMedian(A.low, i, j, r)
     else
         return rangeMedian(A.high, i, j, r-t)
 }

If we know that the number of elements of  that
Then . The total cost for any query, without considering the partitioning part, is  since at most  recursion calls are done and only a constant number of operations are performed in each of them (to get the value of  fractional cascading should be used).
The algorithm can also be modified to solve the online version of the problem.

Majority
Finding frequent elements in a given set of items is one of the most important tasks in data mining. Finding frequent elements might be a difficult task to achieve when most items have similar frequencies. Therefore, it might be more beneficial if some threshold of significance was used for detecting such items. One of the most famous algorithms for finding the majority of an array was proposed by Boyer and Moore  which is also known as the Boyer–Moore majority vote algorithm. Boyer and Moore proposed an algorithm to find the majority element of a string (if it has one) in  time and using   space. In the context of Boyer and Moore’s work and generally speaking, a majority element in a set of items (for example string or an array) is one whose number of instances is more than half of the size of that set. Few years later, Misra and Gries  proposed a more general version of Boyer and Moore's algorithm using  comparisons to find all items in an array whose relative frequencies are greater than some threshold . A range -majority query is one that, given a subrange of a data structure (for example an array) of size , returns the set of all distinct items that appear more than (or in some publications equal to)  times in that given range. In different structures that support range -majority queries,  can be either static (specified during preprocessing) or dynamic (specified at query time). Many of such approaches are based on the fact that, regardless of the size of the range, for a given  there could be at most  distinct candidates with relative frequencies at least . By verifying each of these candidates in constant time,   query time is achieved. Due to this decomposability, some data structures answer -majority queries on one-dimensional arrays by finding the Lowest common ancestor (LCA) of the endpoints of the query range in a Range tree and validating two sets of candidates (of size ) from each endpoint to the lowest common ancestor in constant time resulting in  query time.

Two-dimensional arrays 
Gagie et al. proposed a data structure that supports range -majority queries on an   array . This data structure supports dynamic thresholds (specified at query time) and a preprocessing threshold  based on which it is constructed. During the preprocessing, a set of vertical and horizontal intervals are built on the  array. Together, a vertical and a horizontal interval form a block. Each block is part of a superblock nine times bigger than itself (three times the size of the block's horizontal interval and three times the size of its vertical one). For each block a set of candidates (with  elements at most) is stored which consists of elements that have relative frequencies at least  (the preprocessing threshold as mentioned above) in its respective superblock. These elements are stored in non-increasing order according to their frequencies and it is easy to see that, any element that has a relative frequency at least  in a block must appear its set of candidates. Each -majority query is first answered by finding the query block, or the biggest block that is contained in the provided query rectangle in  time. For the obtained query block,  the first  candidates are returned (without being verified) in  time, so this process might return some false positives. Many other data structures (as discussed below) have proposed methods for verifying each candidate in constant time and thus maintaining the  query time while returning no false positives.

where  is the preprocessing threshold of the -th instance. Thus, for query blocks smaller than  the -th instance is queried. As mentioned above, this data structure has query time   and requires  bits of space by storing a Huffman-encoded copy of it (note the  factor and also see Huffman coding).

One-dimensional arrays 
To answer such queries, Chan et al. begin by noting that there exists a data structure capable of returning the top-k most frequent items in a range in  time requiring  words of space. For a one-dimensional array , let a one-sided top-k range query to be of form . For a maximal range of ranges  in which the frequency of a distinct element  in  remains unchanged (and equal to ), a horizontal line segment is constructed. Since adding each element to  changes the frequency of exactly one distinct element, the aforementioned process creates  line segments. Moreover, for a vertical line  all horizonal line segments intersecting it are sorted according to their frequencies. A top-k query can then be answered by shooting a vertical ray  and reporting the first  horizontal line segments that intersect it (remember from above that these line line segments are already sorted according to their frequencies) in  time.

The top-k data structure at each node is constructed based on the values existing in the subtrees of that node and is meant to answer one-sided range top-k queries. Please note that for a one-dimensional array , a range tree can be constructed by dividing  into two halves and recursing on both halves; therefore, each node of the resulting range tree represents a range. It can also be seen that this range tree requires  words of space, because there are  levels and each level  has  nodes.

Note that there exists a data structure requiring  bits of space that is capable of answering the LCA queries in  time. These two one-sided range top-k queries return the top-() most frequent elements in each of their respective ranges in  time. Each candidate is then assessed in constant time using a linear-space data structure (as described in Lemma 3 in ) that is able to determine in   time whether or not a given subrange of an array  contains at least  instances of a particular element .

Tree paths 
More formally, let  be a labelled tree in which each node has a label from an alphabet of size .

To construct this data structure, first  nodes are marked. For a marked node ,  different sequences (paths towards the root)  are stored,

for  where  returns the label of the direct parent of node . Put another way, for each marked node, the set of all paths with a power of two length (plus one for the node itself) towards the root is stored. Moreover, for each , the set of all majority candidates  are stored. It is easy to see that the set of candidates  can have at most  distinct labels for each . It is easy to see that this data structure require  words of space, because as mentioned above in the construction phase  nodes are marked and for each marked node some  candidate sets are stored. By definition, for each marked node  of such sets are stores, each of which contains  candidates. Therefore, this data structure requires  words of space.

Please note that, boundary nodes have to be handled accordingly so that all of these subpaths are disjoint and from all of them a set of  candidates is derived. Each of these candidates is then verified using a combination of the  query which returns the lowest ancestor of node  that has label  and the  fields of each node. On a -bit RAM and an alphabet of size , the  query can be answered in  time whilst having linear space requirements.

Related problems
All the problems described above have been studied for higher dimensions as well as their dynamic versions. On the other hand, range queries might be extended to other data structures like trees, such as the level ancestor problem. A similar family of problems are orthogonal range queries, also known as counting queries.

See also 
 Level ancestor problem
 Lowest common ancestor

References

External links
Open Data Structure - Chapter 13 - Data Structures for Integers
Data Structures for Range Median Queries - Gerth Stolting Brodal and Allan Gronlund Jorgensen

Arrays